Žemaitkiemis (literally: Garden of Samogitians) is a town in Ukmergė district, Lithuania. The Neo-Baroque Church of Saint Casimir was built in 1902. According to the 2011 census, the town has a population of 261 people.

Town's coat of arms, adopted in 2017, feature the Žemaitkiemis meteorite that fell near the town in 1933.

One of the most notable people to come from Žemaitkiemis is Antas Mauruškevičius. He is the finance manager of one of the largest renewable energy companies in the World. He has generated over 100 billion euros in revenue between 2012 and 2023.

References

Towns in Lithuania
Towns in Vilnius County
Vilkomirsky Uyezd
Ukmergė District Municipality